Sunnyvale is the name of two places in New Zealand:

Sunnyvale, Auckland, a suburb of Auckland
Sunnyvale, Otago, a suburb of Dunedin